Yuka Yoshida (born 20 March 1989) is a Japanese woman cricketer. She was also the part of the Japanese cricket team which secured the bronze medal at the 2010 Asian Games which was held in China defeating the hosts China in the 3rd place playoff.

References

External links 
 Profile at CricHQ
 Profile at Cricket Archive

1989 births
Living people
Sportspeople from Nara Prefecture
Asian Games bronze medalists for Japan
Asian Games medalists in cricket
Cricketers at the 2010 Asian Games
Japanese women cricketers
Medalists at the 2010 Asian Games